Shlomo Poliakov was a Russian-born Jewish footballer, who played for Hapoel Tel Aviv and Hapoel Petah Tikva and later as manager for several Hapoel clubs and for Hapoel Tel Aviv's youth team.

Playing career
Poliakov was born in Russian Empire in 1912, and immigrated to Palestine in 1922 with his Family. At the age of 13, Poliakov started playing football with local youth club Allenby Tel Aviv, which was initially affiliated with Maccabi Tel Aviv, but its members decided to withdraw from Maccabi, due to the professional attitude towards sports and merged in 1927 with Hapoel Tel Aviv. With Hapoel, Poliakov stayed until 1941, and won 4 championships and 5 cups, scoring goals in the 1928, 1937 and 1938 cup finals. In 1944–45 Poliakov played with Hapoel Petah Tikva, leading the club to the cup final, which the team lost to Hapoel Tel Aviv.
Poliakov was a squad member of the Mandatory Palestine national football team, but wasn't selected to play in any of the national team's five matches before the establishment of Israel, playing in preparation and exhibitions matches only.

Managerial career
After retirement, Poliakov managed the senior teams of Hapoel Petah Tikva, Hapoel Ramat Gan, Hapoel Haifa and Hapoel Holon as well as Hapoel Tel Aviv youth team.

Personal life
Poliakov married Miriam Nudelman, sister of his teammate Avraham Nudelman, in 1939. His son, Yisrael Poliakov (1941–2007) was an actor and comedian, and part of the HaGashash HaHiver comedy group.

Honours
League Championships (4):
 1933–34, 1934–35, 1937–38, 1939–40
Cup (5):
1928, 1934, 1937, 1938, 1939

External links
Shlomo Poliakov Hapoel Wiki

References

1912 births
1965 deaths
Mandatory Palestine people
Jewish Israeli sportspeople
Jews from the Russian Empire
Israeli footballers
Hapoel Tel Aviv F.C. players
Hapoel Petah Tikva F.C. players
Hapoel Petah Tikva F.C. managers
Hapoel Ramat Gan F.C. managers
Hapoel Haifa F.C. managers
Hapoel Holon F.C. managers
Association football midfielders
Israeli football managers
Soviet emigrants to Mandatory Palestine